Delmer "Del" Lord (October 7, 1894March 23, 1970) was a Canadian film director and actor best known as a director of Three Stooges films.

Career
Delmer Lord was born in the small town of Grimsby, Ontario, Canada. Interested in the theatre, he traveled to New York City, then when fellow Canadian Mack Sennett offered him a job at his new Keystone Studios, Lord went on to work in Hollywood, California. There he played the driver of the Keystone Cops police van, appearing in many of the Cops' successful films.

Given a chance to direct, Del Lord became a specialist in automotive gags, rigging cars to explode, crash, fall apart, or dangle in precarious positions. Lord was responsible for a number of very successful comedies for Keystone and directed two feature films for Universal Pictures. However, the Great Depression plagued the film industry with budget cuts, and Sennett was forced to close his studio in 1933. Hal Roach launched a brief series of slapstick comedies with "The Taxi Boys" (Clyde Cook, Billy Gilbert, Billy Bevan, and other expressive comedians), and these films required outlandish visual gags and a fleet of crazy cars. Del Lord was the ideal man to direct, and he worked on these comedies exclusively for a year. After leaving Roach, Lord joined producer Phil Ryan's short-comedy unit at Paramount Pictures. During the summer of 1934 Lord took a job selling used cars at a relative's automobile agency. Producer Jules White, shopping for a Buick, encountered Lord at the agency and hired him to work at Columbia Pictures.

From 1935 to 1945, Lord directed some of Columbia's fastest and funniest two-reelers and is credited with developing the unique comic style of the Three Stooges. In addition to more than three dozen Stooges films, he directed or co-produced more than 200 motion pictures. 

In 1936 a Canadian law required that American studios would have to release a certain quota of Canadian-made films in order to distribute their own Hollywood productions in Canada. Columbia sent some of its actors and crew members to Canada, including its Canadian-born employees. Del Lord made one feature film there, What Price Vengeance (1937).

Columbia promoted Lord to feature films in 1944. Curiously, most of Lord's Columbia features are action melodramas rather than slapstick comedies; he may have gotten these assignments based on his handling of his one previous Columbia feature, What Price Vengeance.

Lord worked briefly for Monogram Pictures in 1946, and returned to Columbia in 1948. In 1952 he directed Buster Keaton in an industrial featurette, A Paradise for Buster. Del Lord can be seen in an episode of TV's This Is Your Life, honoring Lord's old boss Mack Sennett.

Death
Del Lord died on March 23, 1970 in Calabasas, California and is interred in the Olivewood Memorial Park, in Riverside, California.

Popular culture
Two rock bands took their names from the Stooges' frequently credited director: the Del-Lourds (of New Jersey, 1963) and the Del Lords (of New York, 1983-90 and 2010-13).

Selected filmography

Lizzies of the Field (1924)
Topsy and Eva (1927)
Lost at the Front (1927)
Barnum Was Right (1929)
The Loud Mouth (1932)
Oh, My Nerves (1935)
Three Stooges shorts (1935–1948, more than three dozen films)
Trapped by Television (1936)
Vengeance (1937)
Kansas City Kitty (1944)
Let's Go Steady (1945)
 I Love a Bandleader (1945)
 Rough, Tough and Ready (1945)
Singin' in the Corn (1946)
In Fast Company (1946)	
It's Great to Be Young (1946)

See also
Canadian pioneers in early Hollywood

References

External links

1894 births
1970 deaths
Burials at Olivewood Memorial Park
Film directors from Ontario
Canadian male film actors
Male actors from Ontario
People from Grimsby, Ontario
Canadian expatriate film directors in the United States
20th-century Canadian male actors